Parade en sept nuits is a 1941 French film.

Plot
In a dog pound, one of the dog tells stories about his former life, including adventures in a circus.

Production
Production commenced in 1940 at Francoeur Studios in Paris, but was interrupted by the war. It resumed almost a year later in the city of Nice at the Victorine Studios

References

External links
Parade en sept nuits at IMDb

1941 films
French anthology films
Films about dogs
French black-and-white films
1940s French-language films
1940s French films